The Literary Review is an American  literary magazine founded in 1957.  The biannual magazine is published internationally by Fairleigh Dickinson University in Madison, New Jersey.  In addition to the publication of short stories, poems, and essays, The Literary Review publishes English translations of contemporary fiction from various countries around the world, often dedicating an entire issue to a single language (e.g. Japanese translations).

Since its inception, The Literary Review has published the work of 22 Nobel Laureates. Recent articles and stories published in The Literary Review have been anthologized in  The Best American Mystery Stories and elsewhere.

The Literary Review maintains a close relationship with the Fairleigh Dickinson University writing MFA program; several of the program's students can be found on the publication's masthead.  It offers the annual Charles Angoff Award for outstanding contributions to the magazine in honour of The Literary Review's editor, poet and novelist Charles Angoff (1902–1979), who served as editor from 1957 to 1976. 

The Literary Review under the editorial direction of Walter Cummins was the second literary journal to appear on the Internet, only months behind The Mississippi Review in 1995.

References

External links
 
The Golden Age of TLR - Editor Walter Cummins

Biannual magazines published in the United States
Fairleigh Dickinson University
Literary magazines published in the United States
Literary translation magazines
Magazines established in 1957
Magazines published in New Jersey
Quarterly magazines published in the United States